Ghoveyleh-ye Naqed (also Romanized as Ghoveyleh-ye Nāqed) is a village in Howmeh-ye Gharbi Rural District, in the Central District of Ramhormoz County, Khuzestan Province, Iran. At the 2006 census, its population was 134, in 29 families.

References 

Populated places in Ramhormoz County